Gryllacridinae is an Orthopteran subfamily in the family Gryllacrididae.

Tribes and Genera 
The Orthoptera Species File lists:

Ametrini 
Auth.: Cadena-Castañeda, 2019; 
genus group Ametrae Cadena-Castañeda, 2019
distribution: Australia
 Ametrus Brunner von Wattenwyl, 1888
 Pareremus Ander, 1934
genus group Apotrechae Cadena-Castañeda, 2019
distribution: southern China, Vietnam, Australia (may be incomplete)
 Apotrechus Brunner von Wattenwyl, 1888
 Apterolarnaca Gorochov, 2004
genus group Apteronomae Cadena-Castañeda, 2019
distribution: Australia only
 Ametrosomus Tepper, 1892
 Apteronomus Tepper, 1892

Ametroidini 
Auth.: Cadena-Castañeda, 2019; distribution: Africa including Madagascar
 Ametroides Karny, 1928
 Atychogryllacris Karny, 1937
 Glomeremus Karny, 1937
 Ingrischgryllacris Cadena-Castañeda, 2019
 Pseuderemus Karny, 1932

Eremini 
Auth.: Cadena-Castañeda, 2019; distribution: Asia, Australia
 Cooraboorama Rentz, 1990
 Eremus Brunner von Wattenwyl, 1888
 Giganteremus Karny, 1937
 Haplogryllacris Karny, 1937
 Hugelgryllacris Cadena-Castañeda, 2019
 Kinemania Rentz, 1990
 Wirritina Rentz, 1990

Gryllacridini 

Auth.: Blanchard, 1845; distribution: worldwide, especially tropics
genus group Anancistrogerae Cadena-Castañeda, 2019
 Anancistrogera Karny, 1937
 Ancistrogera Brunner von Wattenwyl, 1898
 Angustogryllacris Ingrisch, 2018
 Aphanogryllacris Karny, 1937
 Celebogryllacris Karny, 1937
genus group Gryllacrae Blanchard, 1845
 Caustogryllacris Karny, 1937
 Eugryllacris Karny, 1937
 Gryllacris Serville, 1831
 Lyperogryllacris Karny, 1937
 Nesogryllacris Karny, 1937 - monotypic N. wetterana from Wetter Island
 Ocellarnaca Gorochov, 2004
 Phlebogryllacris Karny, 1937
 Prosopogryllacris Karny, 1937
 Willemsegryllacris Cadena-Castañeda, 2019 - monotypic W. barnesi from India
 Xanthogryllacris Karny, 1937
genus group Metriogryllacrae Cadena-Castañeda, 2019
 Furcilarnaca Gorochov, 2004
 Homogryllacris Liu, 2007
 Metriogryllacris Karny, 1937
 Pseudasarca Ingrisch, 2018
genus group not assigned
 Afroneanias Karny, 1937
 Amphibologryllacris Karny, 1937
 Arrolla Rentz, 1990
 Australogryllacris Karny, 1937
 Barombogryllacris Karny, 1937
 Brachybaenus Karny, 1937
 Brachyntheisogryllacris Karny, 1937
 Camptonotus Uhler, 1864
 Caudafistulus Cadena-Castañeda, 2021
 Celeboneanias Karny, 1937
 Dinolarnaca Gorochov, 2008
 Glolarnaca Gorochov, 2008
 Gorochovgryllacris Cadena-Castañeda, 2019
 Griffinigryllacris Cadena-Castañeda, 2019
 Idiolarnaca - monotypic I. hamata Gorochov, 2005 - Philippines
 Larnaca Walker, 1869
 Melaneremus Karny, 1937
 Melanogryllacris Karny, 1937
 Microlarnaca Gorochov, 2004
 Minigryllacris Ingrisch, 2018
 Monseremus Ingrisch, 2018
 Nannogryllacris Karny, 1937
 Neanias Brunner von Wattenwyl, 1888
 Neoeremus Karny, 1937
 Neolarnaca Gorochov, 2004
 Nippancistroger Griffini, 1913
 Otidiogryllacris Karny, 1937
 Papuoneanias Karny, 1929
 Paraneanias Ingrisch, 2018
 Rentzgryllacris Cadena-Castañeda, 2019
 Siderogryllacris Karny, 1937
 Solomogryllacris Willemse, 1953
 Stictogryllacris Karny, 1937
 Tytthogryllacris Karny, 1937

Progryllacridini 
Auth.: Cadena-Castañeda, 2019; distribution: South America, Africa
 Brunnergryllacris Cadena-Castañeda, 2019
 Karnygryllacris Cadena-Castañeda, 2019
 Magnumtergalis Cadena-Castañeda, 2020
 Progryllacris Ander, 1939

incertae sedis 
 Triaenogryllacris Karny, 1937
 Niphetogryllacris Karny, 1937
 †Plesiolarnaca – monotypic - P. prior Gorochov, 2010

References

External links 

Orthoptera subfamilies
Gryllacrididae